Je-Vaughn Tidley Watson (born 22 October 1983) is a Jamaican footballer.

Career

Club

Sporting Central Academy 
Watson attended Garvey Maceo High School and turned professional in 2005. He spent six years playing with Sporting Central Academy in the Jamaica National Premier League, eventually becoming the club's captain.

Houston Dynamo 
Watson had trials in England and Denmark, but after training with the club during the 2011 pre-season, Watson signed with Houston Dynamo of Major League Soccer on 15 April; he made his Dynamo debut on 23 April 2011 in a 1–1 tie with Chicago Fire. He became the first Sporting Central player to secure a professional contract overseas. Watson appeared for Houston in the 2011 MLS Cup and CONCACAF Champions League competitions.

FC Dallas 
Watson was traded to FC Dallas on 19 February 2013 in exchange for a second-round 2015 MLS SuperDraft pick. His contract was terminated on 18 February 2016. On 4 March 2016, it was announced that Watson had resigned with Dallas and then been traded to New England Revolution for a third-round pick in the 2017 MLS SuperDraft.

New England Revolution 
Watson played two seasons with the Revolution. His option was declined at the end of the 2017 season.

OKC Energy FC 
In 2019, Watson signed for OKC Energy FC.

Austin Bold FC 
In September 2020, Watson signed with USL Championship side Austin Bold.

Humble Lions 
In August 2021, Watson returned to Jamaica to play for JPL side, Humble Lions.

International
Watson made his international debut for the Jamaica national football team on 26 July 2008 in a friendly against El Salvador and has since gone on to make 13 appearances for the Reggae Boyz. He played in Jamaica's 2010 FIFA World Cup qualifier against Honduras.

International goals
Scores and results list Jamaica's goal tally first.

Honours

Jamaica

 CONCACAF Gold Cup Runner-Up (2): 2015, 2017

Houston Dynamo
Major League Soccer Eastern Conference Championship (2): 2011, 2012

References

External links
 
 

1983 births
Living people
Jamaican footballers
Jamaican expatriate footballers
Jamaica international footballers
Expatriate soccer players in the United States
Houston Dynamo FC players
FC Dallas players
New England Revolution players
Charlotte Independence players
OKC Energy FC players
Austin Bold FC players
Jamaican expatriate sportspeople in the United States
Major League Soccer players
2011 CONCACAF Gold Cup players
2014 Caribbean Cup players
2015 Copa América players
2015 CONCACAF Gold Cup players
Copa América Centenario players
2017 CONCACAF Gold Cup players
Sporting Central Academy players
People from Saint Catherine Parish
Association football defenders
Association football midfielders
2019 CONCACAF Gold Cup players